Diosdani Castillo Vergel (born November 22, 1987), also known as Diosdany Castillo, is a Cuban baseball pitcher for the Rieleros de Aguascalientes of the Mexican Baseball League.

Castillo played for the Naranjas de Villa Clara in the Cuban National Series and for the Cuba national baseball team at the 2013 World Baseball Classic. In July 2014, Castillo was kicked off Villa Clara's team for a failed defection attempt in an effort to play in Major League Baseball. He successfully defected from Cuba to Mexico in August. He started the 2016 season with the Tigres de Quintana Roo, but was traded to the Rieleros de Aguascalientes on June 7, 2016. He was released by the Rieleros on June 21, 2016, after two starts.

See also
List of baseball players who defected from Cuba

References

External links

 

1987 births
Living people
Baseball pitchers
2013 World Baseball Classic players
Defecting Cuban baseball players
Naranjas de Villa Clara players
Tigres de Quintana Roo players
Rieleros de Aguascalientes players